Didymops floridensis
Didymops transversa
Epophthalmia australis
Epophthalmia elegans
Epophthalmia frontalis
Epophthalmia kuani
Epophthalmia vittata
Epophthalmia vittigera
Macromia aculeata
Macromia alleghaniensis
Macromia amphigena
Macromia amymone
Macromia annulata
Macromia arachnomima
Macromia astarte
Macromia bartenevi
Macromia berlandi
Macromia calliope
Macromia callisto
Macromia celaeno
Macromia celebia
Macromia chaiyaphumensis
Macromia chalciope
Macromia chui
Macromia cincta
Macromia cingulata
Macromia clio
Macromia corycia
Macromia cupricincta
Macromia cydippe
Macromia daimoji
Macromia dione
Macromia ellisoni
Macromia erato
Macromia euphrosyne
Macromia eurynome
Macromia euterpe
Macromia flavicincta
Macromia flavocolorata
Macromia flavovittata
Macromia flinti
Macromia fulgidifrons
Macromia gerstaeckeri
Macromia hamata
Macromia hermione
Macromia holthuisi
Macromia icterica
Macromia ida
Macromia illinoiensis
Macromia indica
Macromia irata
Macromia irina
Macromia jucunda
Macromia katae
Macromia kiautai
Macromia kubokaiya
Macromia lachesis
Macromia macula
Macromia magnifica
Macromia malleifera
Macromia manchurica
Macromia margarita
Macromia melpomene
Macromia miniata
Macromia mnemosyne
Macromia moorei
Macromia negrito
Macromia pacifica
Macromia pallida
Macromia pinratani
Macromia polyhymnia
Macromia pyramidalis
Macromia septima
Macromia sombui
Macromia sophrosyne
Macromia splendens
Macromia taeniolata
Macromia terpsichore
Macromia tillyardi
Macromia urania
Macromia viridescens
Macromia westwoodii
Macromia whitei
Macromia yunnanensis
Macromia zeylanica
Phyllomacromia aeneothorax
Phyllomacromia aequatorialis
Phyllomacromia amicorum
Phyllomacromia aureozona
Phyllomacromia bicristulata
Phyllomacromia bifasciata
Phyllomacromia bispina
Phyllomacromia caneri
Phyllomacromia congolica
Phyllomacromia flavimitella
Phyllomacromia funicularia
Phyllomacromia funicularioides
Phyllomacromia gamblesi
Phyllomacromia girardi
Phyllomacromia hervei
Phyllomacromia kimminsi
Phyllomacromia lamottei
Phyllomacromia legrandi
Phyllomacromia maesi
Phyllomacromia melania
Phyllomacromia monoceros
Phyllomacromia nigeriensis
Phyllomacromia nyanzana
Phyllomacromia occidentalis
Phyllomacromia onerata
Phyllomacromia overlaeti
Phyllomacromia pallidinervis
Phyllomacromia paludosa
Phyllomacromia paula
Phyllomacromia picta
Phyllomacromia pseudafricana
Phyllomacromia royi
Phyllomacromia seydeli
Phyllomacromia sophia
Phyllomacromia subtropicalis
Phyllomacromia sylvatica
Phyllomacromia trifasciata
Phyllomacromia unifasciata
Phyllomacromia villiersi

L